Martin Jean-Jacques (born 2 July 1960) was a Dominican cricketer. During his eight years in first-class cricket, he played for Derbyshire and Hampshire.

On Jean-Jacques' debut he hit a 73, batting at number ten, and setting a record tenth-wicket partnership for the Derbyshire team of 132 with teammate Alan Hill. This was soon followed by his best match figures of 8/77, with a match total of 10/125. Having been brought to Derbyshire's attention thanks to his skilful bowling for Buckinghamshire, he only found himself utilized by the team when another seam bowler was unavailable, thus limiting his chances.

When Jean-Jacques' contract was up in 1992, several counties showed interest, though he was to sign for Hampshire. Still suffering with his pace and rhythm, he found himself out of a career after seeing out his two-year Hampshire contract in 1994. For both Derbyshire and Hampshire, Jean-Jacques was a tailending batsman.

Jean-Jacques was on the Derbyshire Second XI side which won the Bain Dawes Trophy in 1987.

References

External links
Martin Jean-Jacques at CricketArchive 

Buckinghamshire cricketers

1960 births
Living people
Derbyshire cricketers
Hampshire cricketers
Dominica cricketers
Dominica expatriate sportspeople in England
People from Saint Mark Parish, Dominica